Asiophantes is a genus of Asian dwarf spiders that was first described by K. Y. Eskov in 1993.  it contains only two species, both found in Russia: A. pacificus and A. sibiricus.

See also
 List of Linyphiidae species

References

Araneomorphae genera
Linyphiidae
Spiders of Russia